Manikyapuram is a village in Srikakulam district of the Indian state of Andhra Pradesh. 

Majority of population in this village speaks odiya and few Telugu   . Manikyapuram is bordered by Kaviti mandal to the north, Kanchili and Sompeta mandals to the south, Odisha state to the west and the Bay of Bengal to the east.

References

Villages in Srikakulam district